The London Court of International Arbitration is a British private company limited by guarantee with a head office in London. It offers dispute resolution through arbitration and mediation.

History

The City of London Chamber of Arbitration was established in 1892, not long after the Arbitration Act of 1889 became law. It consisted of members of the City of London Corporation and the London Chamber of Commerce & Industry, and had its seat at the Guildhall in London. The Law Quarterly Review said of it at the time: "it is to be expeditious where the law is slow".

The name was changed to "London Court of Arbitration" in 1903, and to the present name in 1981. It was incorporated as a private company limited by guarantee in 1986.

References 

International arbitration courts and tribunals
International organisations based in London
Organizations established in 1892